Silvia Guadalupe Garza Galván (born 5 July 1962) is a Mexican politician affiliated with the PAN. She currently serves as Senator of the LXII Legislature of the Mexican Congress representing Coahuila.

References

1962 births
Living people
Politicians from Monclova
Women members of the Senate of the Republic (Mexico)
Members of the Senate of the Republic (Mexico)
National Action Party (Mexico) politicians
21st-century Mexican politicians
21st-century Mexican women politicians
Members of the Congress of Coahuila
Autonomous University of Nuevo León alumni